The 1944 William & Mary Indians football team represented William & Mary during the 1944 college football season.

Schedule

NFL Draft selections

References 

William and Mary
William & Mary Tribe football seasons
William